The Ohio State Buckeyes women's volleyball is one of the 19 women's varsity teams at Ohio State University in Columbus, Ohio.  The Buckeyes are part of the Big Ten Conference. The team has been coached by Jen Flynn Oldenburg since 2020. Founded and played their first year in 1971, first playing in St. John Arena, Ohio State plays their home games in the Covelli Center.

The team has won 3 regular season conference titles and has appeared in the NCAA Women's Volleyball Championship Tournament 23 times. They appeared in the Final Four twice in 1991 and 1994. Ohio State women's volleyball has been the home of many All-Americans and All Big Ten Honorees.

Year-by-Year records

Venues

St. John Arena 
The former home of the Ohio State women's volleyball team. The buckeyes were located in St. John Arena from 1989 until 2018 before the teams departure for the Covelli Center. While in the arena the Buckeyes has a record of 333–115. The Buckeyes played their only two undefeated home seasons in St. John Arena in 1989 and 1991 The team had their final match in St. John as they took a loss to the then number three Minnesota Golden Gophers in a five-set thriller.

Covelli Center 
The Buckeyes play their home matches at the Covelli Center on campus. They began playing at the arena in 2019, after having spent more than 45 seasons at St. John Arena. Their first match at the Covelli Center was played on August 30, 2019, against Lehigh University, which they won, 3–0 (25–16, 25–20, 25–14). The Buckeyes hosted the NCAA Division I women's volleyball tournament at Nationwide Arena in 2016 and are scheduled to host it again in 2021.

Coaches

Coaching History

Coaching staff

Awards

Coaching Awards
The coaching staff at Ohio State have racked up 5 Big Ten Coach of the Year and 4 AVCA regional coach of the year awards.

AVCA Region Coach of the Year 

 Jim Stone (North Central) - 1988
 Jim Stone (Mideast) - 1989, 1999, 2004

Big Ten Coach of the Year 

 Jim Stone - 1989, 1991, 1994, 2004
 Jen Flynn Oldenburg - 2020

Player Awards

Ohio State has enjoyed a rich volleyball player history. An Ohio State player has been named National Player of the Year twice (one co), National Freshman of the Year twice, Big Ten Player of the Year six times, and Big Ten Freshman of the Year seven times.

AVCA National Player of the Year 

 Laura Davis - 1994
 Stacey Gordon (Co) - 2004

Big Ten Player of the Year 

 Holly O'Leary - 1989
 Leisa Wissler - 1991
 Laura Davis - 1994
 Vanessa Wouters - 1996
 Stacey Gordon - 2002, 2004

AVCA National Freshman of the Year 

 Stacey Gordon - 2001
 Emily Londot - 2020

Big Ten Freshman of the Year 

 Leisa Wissler - 1988
 Laura Davis - 1991
 Jenny Jackson -1992
 Dana Stearns - 1997
 Katie Virtue - 1999
 Stacey Gordon - 2001
 Emily Londot - 2020

All-Americans 
Ohio State has had 20 players account for 26 overall and 7 first-team AVCA All-American selections.

References

External links
Official website

 
1971 establishments in Ohio
Volleyball clubs established in 1971